Catan or Settlers of Catan is a board game.

Catan may also refer to:

Spin-offs of the board game
 The Settlers of Catan, a 2003 novel by Rebecca Gable based on the board game
 Catan (2007 video game), a 2007 Xbox Live Arcade video game adapted from the board game
 Catan (2008 video game), a 2008 PlayStation 3 video game adapted from the board game

People with the name
 Saint Catan or Saint Cathan, Irish monk revered as a saint in parts of Scotland
 Daniel Catán (1949–2011), Mexican  composer
 Victor Catan (born 1949), Moldovan politician
 Pete Catan (born 1957), American football player 
 Radu Catan (born 1989), Moldovan footballer

See also 
 
 
 Katan (disambiguation)